Yoo Cheol-sang better known by his stage name Kim Ban-jang is a South Korean singer. He is the leader, vocal and drummer of the band Windy City. In May 2016, he joined the cast of variety show I Live Alone.

Songs

References

External links

1975 births
Living people
21st-century South Korean male singers